The Bang Years 1966-1968 is a compilation album by Neil Diamond of Diamond's 23 songs he recorded for Bang Records in mono.  Originally issued in 2011 by Columbia Records, it was reissued in 2014 by Capitol Records after Diamond signed with Capitol taking his Bang catalog with him.

Track listing
 Solitary Man
 Cherry Cherry
 Girl, You'll Be A Woman Soon
 Kentucky Woman
 Thank the Lord for the Night Time
 You Got To Me
 I'm A Believer
 Red Red Wine
 The Boat That I Row
 Do It
 New Orleans
 Monday Monday
 Red Rubber Ball
 I'll Come Running
 La Bamba
 The Long Way Home
 I've Got The Feeling (Oh No No)
 You'll Forget
 Love To Love
 Someday Baby
 Hanky Panky
 The Time Is Now
 Shilo

Charts

References

Neil Diamond compilation albums
2011 compilation albums
Columbia Records compilation albums
Capitol Records compilation albums